Service Entrance may refer to:
 The Women on the 6th Floor, also known as Service Entrance, a 2010 French film
 Service Entrance (1954 film), a French comedy drama film